Mannan-binding lectin-associated serine protease-2 (MASP-2, MASP2, MBP-associated serine protease-2, mannose-binding lectin-associated serine protease-2, p100, mannan-binding lectin-associated serine peptidase 2) is an enzyme. This enzyme catalyses the following chemical reaction

 Selective cleavage after Arg223 in complement component C2 (-Ser-Leu-Gly-Arg-Lys-Ile-Gln-Ile) and after Arg76 in complement component C4 (-Gly-Leu-Gln-Arg-Ala-Leu-Glu-Ile)

This mannan-binding lectin (MBL) recognizes patterns of neutral carbohydrates, such as mannose and N-acetylglucosamine.

References

External links 
 

EC 3.4.21